Earl of Arran may refer to:

Earl of Arran (Scotland), a title in the Peerage of Scotland
Earl of Arran (Ireland), a title in the Peerage of Ireland
, a steamship 1860–1871

See also

Earl of Arran and Cambridge
Earl of Arran's Regiment of Cuirassiers